Uyeasound is a village on the Isle of Unst, the northernmost island of the Shetland Islands, Scotland. It takes its name from the neighbouring strait of the same name, which looks over to the Isle of Uyea.

Uyeasound is home to Greenwell's Booth, a Hanseatic trading storehouse, as well as Muness Castle.

References

External links

Undiscovered Scotland - Uyeasound
BBC - Domesday Reloaded - Uyeasound Up Helly Aa

Villages in Unst
Straits of Scotland
Landforms of Shetland